The following lists events that happened during 2020 in China.

Incumbents

Paramount leader
 General Secretary of the Communist Party – Xi Jinping

Head of state
 President – Xi Jinping
 Vice President – Wang Qishan

Head of government
 Premier – Li Keqiang
 Vice Premiers – Han Zheng, Sun Chunlan, Hu Chunhua, Liu He

National legislature
 Congress chairman – Li Zhanshu

Political advisory
 Conference chairman – Wang Yang

Supervision commission
 Director: Yang Xiaodu

Governors 
 Governor of Anhui Province – Li Guoying
 Governor of Fujian Province – Tang Dengjie (until 2 July), Wang Ning (starting 2 July)
 Governor of Gansu Province – Tang Renjian
 Governor of Guangdong Province – Ma Xingrui
 Governor of Guizhou Province – Shen Yiqin (until 24 November), Ma Xingrui (starting November)
 Governor of Hainan Province – Shen Xiaoming (until 2 December), Feng Fei (starting December 2)
 Governor of Hebei Province – Xu Qin
 Governor of Heilongjiang Province: – Wang Wentao (until December), vacant thereafter (starting December)
 Governor of Henan Province – Yin Hong
 Governor of Hubei Province – Wang Xiaodong
 Governor of Hunan Province – Xu Dazhe (until November), Mao Weiming (starting November)
 Governor of Jiangsu Province – Wu Zhenglong
 Governor of Jiangxi Province – Yi Lianhong
 Governor of Jilin Province – Jing Junhai (until 25 November), Han Jun (starting November)
 Governor of Liaoning Province – Tang Yijun (until April), Liu Ning (starting April)
 Governor of Qinghai Province – Liu Ning
 Governor of Shaanxi Province – Liu Guozhong (until August), Zhao Yide (from August)
 Governor of Shandong Province – Gong Zheng (until April 17), vacant thereafter (starting April 17)
 Governor of Shanxi Province – Lin Wu
 Governor of Sichuan Province – Yin Li (until 2 December), Huang Qiang (politician) (starting 2 December)
 Governor of Zhejiang Province – Yuan Jiajun (until 4 September), Zheng Shanjie (starting September)

Events

January
January 20 – Chinese Premier Li Keqiang has urged efforts to prevent and control Coronavirus disease 2019.
January 26 – Leading group on the prevention and control of Coronavirus disease 2019 was established, led by Li Keqiang. The leading group has decided to extend Spring Festival holiday to contain the COVID-19 pandemic.
January 27 – Li Keqiang visited Wuhan, center of what became the COVID-19 pandemic, to direct the epidemic prevention work.
January 28 – The opening of Dabie Mountain Regional Medical Centre in Huangzhou District, Huanggang, Hubei.
January 30 – At the World Health Organization's second meeting of the Emergency Committee declared the Wuhan outbreak of novel coronavirus a Public Health Emergency of International Concern (PHEIC).

February 
February 3 – Huoshenshan Hospital accepted patients after a speedy construction build period. 
February 6 – Leishenshan Hospital passed evaluations and will begin accepting patients soon.
February 10 – An advance World Health Organization team of medical experts has arrived in China, led by Dr. Bruce Aylward, who coordinated the WHO's Ebola Response in 2016. 
February 28 – Three time Chinese Olympic swimming champion, Sun Yang, has been given an 8-year ban for missing a doping test in September 2018 by the Court of Arbitration for Sport.

March 

March 7 – Collapse of Xinjia Express Hotel
March 10 – Chinese Communist Party general secretary Xi Jinping visits Wuhan, the origin of the COVID-19 pandemic, after an unprecedented lockdown of the central city of 11 million people.
March 24 – Chinese Premier Li Keqiang reported that spread of the domestically transmitted epidemic has been basically blocked and the COVID-19 pandemic has been controlled in China.
March 28 – A tailings dam fails at the Yichun Luming mine

April 
 April 4 – Coinciding with the Qingming Festival, a national day of mourning was declared followed by a three-minute silence to honor 3,300+ people who died of COVID-19.

May 
 May 9 – Several Indian and Chinese soldiers were injured in a cross-border clash at the Nathu La crossing. Around one hundred and fifty troops clashed in a "standoff" that included fistfights and stone-throwing.

June 
 June 26 – Nearly 50 independent United Nations Human Rights experts highlighted their concern on the situation in China. They voiced concern for many actions including but not limited to allegations of forced labor; arbitrary interferences with the right to privacy; restrictive cybersecurity, anti-terrorism, and sedition laws; the retaliation against journalists, medical workers and others speaking out about COVID-19; the repression of ethnic minorities in Xinjiang and Tibet; and the repression of protests and democracy advocacy in the Hong Kong Special Administrative Region (SAR). They urged China to "withdraw the draft national security law for Hong Kong".

July 
 July 7 – Anshun bus crash

September 

 September 22 – During the 2020 United Nations General Assembly, President Xi Jinping announces that China will aim to hit peak emissions before 2030 and for carbon neutrality by 2060.

Popular culture

Film
List of Chinese films of 2020

Deaths
 February 7 – Li Wenliang
 September 7 – Gao Wenbin

See also

Country overviews
 China
 History of China
 History of modern China
 Outline of China
 Government of China
 Politics of China
 Timeline of Chinese history
 Years in China

Related timelines for current period
 2020
 2020 in politics and government
 2020s

References

Links
 

 
2020s in China
Years of the 21st century in China
China
China